Aaron Goldstein may refer to:

Aaron Goldstein (entrepreneur) from Leerom Segal
Aaron Goldstein (musician) (born 1983), Canadian musician
Robert Aaron Gordon (1908–1978), American economist who was born Aaron Goldstein

See also
Samuel Aaron Goldstein